Jabol is a slang name for a kind of cheap Polish fruit wine that is made from fermented fruit and is bottled at 8% to 18% alcohol by volume. Its name seems to be derived from jabłko, the Polish word for "apple," which it is often made from. Though it is usually fruit flavoured, it can come in other flavours such as chocolate or mint.

It comes in a variety of containers and is sold under a variety of names.

Slang names
Apart from "jabol" or "jabcok", this beverage has amassed a variety of colourful slang names. Two that are commonly encountered are "sikacz" (a reference to the effect of alcohol on urination) and "siarkofrut" (a reference to the Bobofrut brand of children's fruit juice, as well as to the wine's taste of sulfur, a result from its low-quality production process).

History
Jabol is produced by several companies and has been drunk by generations of Poles. It is especially popular in Polish punk culture.

Packaging and price
Jabol is sold in glass and plastic bottles or cartons (similar to milk or juice cartons). It is priced at about 4.50 PLN (1.60 USD) for a 0.70L bottle. Sometimes a deposit is required on bottles, which is usually 20–30% of the wine price.

In popular culture
 Pieniądze to nie wszystko – comedy film by Juliusz Machulski from 2000
 Jabol punk, Jabolowe ofiary (Jabol victims or Jabol losers) – songs by KSU from album Pod prąd.
 Tanie Wino (Cheap wine) – song by Haratacze
 SO2 – song by Zielone Żabki (sulfur dioxide reference)
 Acid Drinkers – Polish thrash metal band. The name is a reference to the drink.
 Autobiografia – one of the most popular songs by the Polish band Perfect.
 Arizona – documentary by Ewa Borzęcka from 1997, showing life in poor Polish village.
 O Jeden Most Za Daleko (One bridge too far) – song from 2022 by a heavy metal band Nocny Kochanek.

See also
Flavored fortified wines
Jug wine
Plonk (wine)

References

External links
Polish site about jabol

Fermented drinks
Polish alcoholic drinks
Fruit wines